"Hatrið mun sigra" ("Hatred will prevail") is a song by Icelandic band Hatari. It won Söngvakeppnin 2019 and finished 10th at the Eurovision Song Contest 2019 in Tel Aviv, Israel. The song was the first Eurovision Song Contest entry to be performed in Icelandic since 2013.
An extended version of the song is included in the band's debut studio album, Neyslutrans (2020).

Eurovision Song Contest

The song was chosen to represent Iceland in the Eurovision Song Contest 2019 after Hatari was selected through Söngvakeppnin 2019, the national selection process organised by the Icelandic National Broadcasting Service for Iceland's entry for the Eurovision Song Contest. On 28 January 2019, a special allocation draw was held which placed each country into one of the two semi-finals, as well as which half of the show they would perform in. Iceland was placed into the first semi-final, to be held on 14 May 2019, and was scheduled to perform in the second half of the show. Once all the competing songs for the 2019 contest had been released, the running order for the semi-finals was decided by the show's producers rather than through another draw, so that similar songs were not placed next to each other. Iceland was set to perform in position 13. It was performed during the first semi-final on 14 May 2019, and qualified for the final, where it finished in 10th place with 232 points.

Charts

References

2019 songs
Eurovision songs of 2019
Eurovision songs of Iceland
Icelandic-language songs